Schlammersdorf is a municipality  in the district of Neustadt an der Waldnaab in Bavaria, Germany.

People
 Petra Dettenhöfer, politician (* 1957) (CSU), since 2008 member of the Landtag of Bavaria

References

Neustadt an der Waldnaab (district)